Topoľa is a village and municipality in Snina District in the Prešov Region of north-eastern Slovakia.

Geography
The municipality is located in Snina District in the Prešov Region of north-eastern Slovakia. It lies at an altitude of 384 metres and covers an area of 26.384 km². According to the 2013 census, it had a population of 159 inhabitants.

History
In historical records the village was first mentioned in 1337. The Greek Catholic wooden church of Archangel Michael located on the hill above the village dates back as far as 1700. There is a cemetery of soldiers who fell in World War I adjacent to the church. The name of the village is derived from topoľ, the poplar tree.

Protected areas and natural landmarks

The municipality is situated in the buffer zone of the Poloniny National Park. It offers easy access to most of the National Park's hiking trails. Havešová, a component of the Primeval Beech Forests of the Carpathians UNESCO World Heritage Site, is also located close to the village.

Gallery

See also
Bukovské vrchy
Stužica
Poloniny National Park

References

External links
 
 
 Village of Topoľa
 Wooden Churches in Slovakia

Villages and municipalities in Snina District